"I Miss You" is a song by American rock band Blink-182, released on February 2, 2004, as the second single from the group's untitled fifth studio album (2003). Co-written by guitarist Tom DeLonge and bassist Mark Hoppus, they employed a method of writing separately and bringing their two verses together later. The song, produced entirely acoustic, features an acoustic electric bass, a cello, and a brushstroked drum loop. The song was inspired by the Cure song "The Love Cats" and contains references to The Nightmare Before Christmas (1993).

The song peaked at number one on the US Billboard Modern Rock Tracks chart and peaked at number 42 on the Billboard Hot 100. Although "All the Small Things" had slightly more radio airplay, "I Miss You" sold more copies, earning gold certification for selling over 500,000 copies. In the United Kingdom, the song was a national top 10 hit on the UK Singles Chart, peaking at number eight.

Background

"I Miss You" was recorded throughout 2003, and began production at the Rubin's House, a rented home in the San Diego luxury community of Rancho Santa Fe. The song was written using the same method with which the band wrote "Feeling This"; namely, DeLonge and Hoppus would discuss themes and then set off to separate rooms of the home to write alone. The two would first have a discussion about the themes of the song "so that we were on the same page," and then they would go away to write, putting both parts together at the end. Tom wrote the second verse, and Mark wrote the first verse and the chorus.  In 2018, Mark shared the original handwritten lyrics on Twitter. "Mark was always really, really good with words, so a lot of times I would ask him for help with things, to get help with how I say things better [...] But we never really explained song meanings to each other," said DeLonge. Hoppus referenced Tim Burton's The Nightmare Before Christmas at the request of Barker, with the lines "We can live like Jack and Sally if we want... and we'll have Halloween on Christmas",  toward his then-wife, Shanna Moakler.

The trio struggled recording "I Miss You" at first, originally employing a completely different chorus reminiscent of what they considered adult contemporary music. The track was directly inspired by the Cure song "The Love Cats". In expanding on the song's lyrical meaning, DeLonge said: "The song's more about the vulnerability and kind of heart-wrenching pain you feel when you're in love and when you're a guy and you're trying to tell a girl, 'Don't waste your time coming and talking to me because, in my head at least, you probably already gave me up a long time ago.'"

Composition
The song is composed in the key of B major and is set in the time signature of common time with a tempo of 110 beats per minute. Hoppus and DeLonge's vocal range spans from F#2 to F#4. "I Miss You" is an all-acoustic affair, featuring a piano, cello, acoustic bass guitar, and a "brushstroked hip-hop groove." The song's production was very layered, requiring multiple tracks. "There's probably 50 tracks of instruments going on the record," DeLonge said. In an interview with The Washington Post, he re-estimated the amount: "It's got about 70 tracks of instruments, all of which are organic/acoustic, none of them plugged-in."

Reception

Commercial performance
"I Miss You" was sent to radio in early 2004. The song performed best on Billboard Modern Rock Tracks chart, where it peaked at number one for two weeks. The song also charted at number 15 on the Pop Songs chart, and number 24 on the Adult Pop Songs chart. On the Billboard Hot 100, the song reached number 42, and also peaked at number 44 on the Hot 100 Airplay chart. Outside the United States, "I Miss You" performed best in the United Kingdom and New Zealand; in both countries it charted at number eight. It also charted at number 13 in Australia, and number 21 in Ireland.

"I Miss You" was supported by a controversial initiative dubbed "spin buys" by Billboard, in which labels, in Blink's case Geffen, spent thousands of dollars per week to have singles played multiple times from midnight to 6am at small and middle-market radio chains. While overnight airplay at radio at that time was "nothing new for the recording industry," label-sponsored spin-programs had risen considerably in popularity in 2004. By May 2004, the track had accumulated more than 50,000 spins at radio, and more than 100,000 by July.

The song was certified gold by the Recording Industry Association of America on October 25, 2004, for sales of over 500,000.

Critical reception
"I Miss You" received positive reviews from contemporary music critics. Jesse Lord of IGN praised the "well-thought-out dissonance" between Hoppus and DeLonge's respective vocal tracks, opining that it "expertly showcases and highlights the differences between the two." Nick Catucci of The Village Voice praised the song, writing, "It's how Tom and Mark zing off of one another that makes Blink-182 one of the greats. Name another two dudes who can so naturally share a tender, swelling ballad like 'I Miss You.'" A.D. Amorosi of The Philadelphia Inquirer wrote that "post-teen amour drips through an acoustic 'I Miss You', with singer-guitarist Tom DeLonge in Marshall Crenshaw mode." Spin called it an "interstate breakup song," commending its use of strings and jazz brushes. In 2016, Stereogum ranked the song number four on their list of the 10 greatest Blink-182 songs, and in 2022, Kerrang ranked the song number three on their list of the 20 greatest Blink-182 songs, while Variety ranked it as one of the best emo songs of all time.

Music video

The song's music video is shot in the style of a 1930s film, and find the trio performing in a haunted house with ghosts circling around. Jonas Åkerlund, who also directed the Prodigy's "Smack My Bitch Up" and Christina Aguilera's "Beautiful," helmed the clip that was filmed on December 17, 2003, in Los Angeles. "He's done amazing videos," DeLonge said. "We kind of had an idea of what we wanted to do, but it's gonna be interesting because with a guy like that, they bring so much artistic vision to the project. You don't really know what's going on in their head, like how they wanna film it and all that stuff." It also features Mark Hoppus playing a double bass, inspired by Phil Thornalley of the Cure's use of one in the video for "The Love Cats".

The song achieved heavy airplay on music video channels. It achieved its best airplay on Canada's MuchMusic, where it was the number one most-played video for the week ending February 22, 2004, as monitored by Nielsen Broadcast Data Systems. For Fuse, the song was the eighth-most played that week, eleventh for MTV, and fourteenth for MTV2. It continued to be a strong performer on Fuse and MuchMusic into May, with the issue dated May 15 reporting it at numbers 9 and eleven, respectively. It remained in the top 30 most-played at MuchMusic into January 2005.

Track listings

Charts

Weekly charts

Year-end charts

Certifications

Release history

In popular culture
The song first appeared in the video game SingStar Amped and as DLC for Rock Band 2. It was also featured in the TV show Legit.
Chilean band Kudai used the drum sample of the song on their single "Escapar" from their 2004 album Vuelo.
Australian band 5 Seconds of Summer covered the song on BBC Radio 1's Live Lounge in 2014. The song was a primary inspiration for The Chainsmokers' 2016 hit single "Closer". According to Chainsmokers member Andrew Taggart, the duo repeatedly listened to the song while writing it. In 2019, American singer-songwriter Skye employed an interpolation of "I Miss You" in his single "Voices", posthumously featuring rapper XXXTentacion.

References

External links
 

Blink-182 songs
2004 singles
2003 songs
2000s ballads
Geffen Records singles
Island Records singles
Music videos directed by Jonas Åkerlund
Rock ballads
Songs written by Mark Hoppus
Songs written by Tom DeLonge
Songs written by Travis Barker